A snap table for metal fabrication is a device used to shear concealed-fastener metal roofing panels including snap-lock and mechanically-seamed profiles.

It is a tool employed by metal roofing contractors for metal roofs in the field, or by metal companies in a shop setting. It works by removing a notch of each rib, slitting the panel in half between the removed notches and rolling the pan over for an eave or valley hem.

References

Cutting tools